Qebchaq or Qebchak may refer to:

Qebchaq, Alborz
Qebchaq, East Azerbaijan
Qebchaq, Tehran

See also
Qepchaq (disambiguation)